Maung Weik (born 11 January 1973, also spelt Maung Wate) is a Burmese tycoon. He is currently chairman of the Mandalay Business Capital City Development (MBCCD) and Sae Paing Company.

Early life and education
In 1973, U Maung Weik was born in Pathein and passed the matriculation exam at the basic education high school in Dagon. In 1995, he graduated from Yangon University specializing in geology.

Sport career
He represented Myanmar as a golf player at the Southeast Asian Games that was held in the Philippines in 1991 and at the Southeast Asian Amateur Golf Team Championship (Putra Cup), which was held in Brunei in 1992 respectively.

Business interests
Maung Weik founded the Maung Weik and Family Company, which had a presence in the development, real estate, trading, and construction sectors.

In 2017, Mandalay City Development Committee approved a public-private partnership with MBCCD for a 10-year mega-development project in Amarapura, projected to include hotels, hospitals, schools, jetties, shopping centers, gardens, and apartment buildings on a plot of  allocated by the Mandalay city government.

Controversies
Maung Weik was a close associate of Khin Nyunt, a former prime minister and military general. He reportedly catered to wealthy young people, notably the sons of the generals. According to the semi-official Myanmar Times, he has engaged in drug trafficking from Malaysia to Burma since 2003.

On 10 July 2008, he was charged with drug abuse and trafficking by the Lanmadaw Township police station, accused of importing ecstasy, methamphetamines, and ketamine, and trafficking them to the children of Burmese military generals and actors. In November 2008, he was sentenced to 15 years in prison on drug trafficking charges by the Lanmadaw Township Court. He reportedly used drugs with Aung Ye Zaw Myint, the son of Ye Myint, a former chief of the Bureau of Special Operations. Maung Weik was released from Pathein Prison on 3 January 2014.

Maung Weik explained that the 2008 conviction by authorities of drug trafficking was "murder without death" at a press conference at the Novotel Hotel in 2016. Moreover, Maung Weik said in front of the media at a press conference that he never used or distributed drugs.

In 2016, Maung Weik courted controversy over bribery allegations that Yangon mayor Phyo Min Thein accepted a  Patek Philippe watch as a gift from Maung Weik.

While he kept doing his business and duties very well, unfortunately in 2016, Local media published the news regarding the controversy over bribery allegations that he bribed U Phyo Min Thein, who used to be Chief Minister of Yangon Region, accepted Patek Philippe's watch as a gift from him. In contraction to that fault press, Maung Weik created a press conference and declared that he was ready for judgment anytime at any court.

Later, he fully supported the National League for Democracy government and became well known for being a closed fan of the NLD government.

2021 Myanmar coup d'état
On 1 February 2021, in the aftermath of the 2021 Myanmar coup d'état, Maung Weik was detained by the military junta. After detaining him for over a month, on 17 March 2021, Myanmar Radio and Television released a video file showing that Maung Weik had donated to Daw Khin Kyi Foundation $550,000 illegally. However, BBC reported that it was a pre-recorded video of low quality that did not sound clear. He accused Aung San Suu Kyi of accepting USD $500,000 in bribes and also accused Mandalay Region Chief Minister, Zaw Myint Maung for accepting bribes of $100,000 and MMK 650 laks for his medical costs in Bangkok.

On 18 February 2022, Maung Weik testified during the court hearing of Zaw Myint Maung, that he made cash donations of 65,000,000 Kyats for Zaw Myint Maung’s medical expenses.

On 23 February 2022, during the court hearing of Dr Myo Aung, who was accused of the acceptance of cash donations for candidates to participate in the election, Maung Weik testified that he made the cash donation of 11,000,000.  

According to media reports, Maung Weik announced a voluntary donation to the Daw Khin Kyi Foundation according to his wishes in the Naypyitaw Special Court on May 31, 2022, in connection with a USD 550,000 donation for the Daw Khin Kyi Foundation, which has filed a corruption lawsuit against Aung San Suu Kyi by SAC.

Many media reported that "he repeatedly said in the court that the case for cash donations was not for bribery, and only to show sympathy as he lost his father and grandfather due to cancer disease".

Philanthropy
In 1999, he donated over 5,000 lakh kyats to the Shwedagon Pagoda,he also donated the umbrella which was also the 7th time crown of Amarapura Pahtodawgyi in 2019.

Maung Weik has donated a large amount of humanitarian aid. Providing humanitarian assistance to the people of Rakhine State, he donated 15,000 lakh kyats to the Resettlement Development Project (UEHRD) in 2017.

On 19 February 19,  Maung Weik make the donation ceremony at the Pahtodawgyi for depositing the shrines and setting up the central pole together with the local people honourably. In addition to that, he also donated the umbrella which was also the 7th time crown of Amarapura Pahtodawgyi.

During the first and second waves of the 2020 Covid-19, free quarantine centers and treatment centers were opened in Rangoon and Mandalay, and Maung Weik's company continues to donate oxygen concentrators and various medicines for Covid-19 until 2022.

Personal life 
He was previously married to Yin Min Thee, the niece of Myint Swe, the Chief Minister of Yangon Region.

Since some media published the press falsely that Yin Min Thi, his ex-spouse, was the niece of Myint Swe, former Vice President, Yin Min Thi had to come out herself in order to solve the issue.

Awards and titles
In 2020, President Win Myint awarded the 8 numbers of local businesses men including Maung Weik with the title Agga Maha Sirisudhamma Manijotadhara.

References

Burmese businesspeople
1973 births
Burmese people of Chinese descent
Living people